Aldenham School is a co-educational independent school for pupils aged eleven to eighteen, located between Elstree and the village of Aldenham in Hertfordshire, England. There is also a preparatory school for pupils from the ages of five to eleven. It was founded in the late sixteenth century by Richard Platt.

History

The school was founded in 1597 by Richard Platt, owner of a City of London brewery and Master of the Worshipful Company of Brewers in 1576 and 1581. In 1596, Queen Elizabeth I granted him letters patent to build "the Free Grammar School and Almshouses" at Aldenham; the foundation stone was laid in 1597. Before Platt died in 1600 he obtained an endowment for the School by a covenant between himself and the Brewers' Company. It became a free village grammar school for young boys, also taking in private pupils.

In the early 19th century an investigation by the Education Charities Commission of the Poor led to the Tudor Grammar School being demolished and replaced by two new schools: a lower school providing an elementary education for the local population, and a grammar school for fee paying boarders.

In the late 1860s, the Platt estate in St Pancras, which provided the endowment of the school, was compulsorily purchased for the construction of the St Pancras railway station, and the Midland Railway had to pay compensation of £91,000, . In a measure described by the headmaster of the time as "a violent act of confiscation", the Endowed Schools Commissioners, acting under the Endowed Schools Act 1869, diverted more than half of this money to other schools. In their scheme approved in 1875, £20,000 went to the North London Collegiate School and Camden School for Girls, £13,333 6s 8d to support secondary education in Watford (see ), £10,000 to Russell Lane School, Southgate, and £8,000 to two elementary schools, Medburn School, Radlett, and Delrow School, Aldenham.

The school expanded during the 20th century, and in the 1970s girls were admitted, thus paving the way for the school to become fully co-educational.

A new Sixth Form Centre was opened in 2012 providing study and recreation facilities for Sixth Formers under one roof.

In the summer of 2016, restorations were carried out on Beevor's and McGill's House, improving and updating the boarding facilities. Owing to the increasing number of girls in the school, in September 2017 Riding's House became a girls' day house.

Quatercentenary
In 1997, Aldenham celebrated its 400th anniversary, or Quatercentenary, which led to what was known at 'The 400 Appeal' being established. Through different events the appeal aimed to raise as much money as possible, to help the school expand ready for the 21st century.

The Quatercentenary began with a launch party with fireworks and a re-enactment of Richard Platt receiving the letters patent from Elizabeth I to build the school. There was also an OA Reunion Day and a 'Festival of the Car', along with a football match: Aldenham vs Watford F.C.

The school was also visited during the year by The Princess Royal, who came to open the new artificial turf pitch that had been built as a result of money raised by the appeal.

Aldenham and its Influence on Football
Football has been a major sport at Aldenham since the dawn of the game. In 1825 Aldenham became the second place, after Eton College, to write down rules for its code of football.

The Football Annual of 1873, edited by Charles W. Alcock, famous secretary of the Football Association and of Surrey County Cricket Club, states that Aldenham School Football Club was founded in 1825. This makes Aldenham School boast the title of having the earliest organised football club in the history of the game (something often awarded to Sheffield which began several years later in 1854). The original facsimile of Aldenham's entry in this 1873 Football Annual relating to this point, held by the Football Association itself, and being from such an authoritative source is perhaps grounds for the legal view that it is conclusive evidence.
The late JR Witty, for so long on the staff of the Football Association wrote, "It was at such schools as Eton, Harrow, Westminster, Shrewsbury, Winchester and Aldenham and the like that Association Football, governed by the Laws of the Game which now operate, had its real formation."

The Good Schools Guide called Aldenham "A seriously sporty school", as well as "Intensely competitive."

Houses

Aldenham has six senior houses and two junior houses.
 McGill's, senior, boarding boys and some day boys
 Beevor's, senior, boarding boys and some day boys
 Kennedy's, senior, boarding boys and some day boys
 Paull's, senior, boarding and day girls
 Riding's, senior, formerly day boys, now day girls
 Leeman's, senior, day boys
 Martineau's, junior boarding and day, boys and girls.
 Woodrow's, junior day boys and girls

Arts and culture 
A Stanley Spencer painting of The Crucifixion was commissioned by the Master of the Brewers Company, for the Aldenham School Chapel in 1958. Aldenham was used to film additional interior scenes in the 1968 classic British film If...., directed by Lindsay Anderson. The most frequently used room was the main school Dining Room containing the portrait of Aldenham's founder Richard Platt. Aldenham was used for scenes in Tom Brown's Schooldays (2005 film). It was used for some scenes in the British satire Greed (2019 film).

Masters
Before the school was rebuilt and enlarged in 1824, the head of the school was known as the Master. The founder, Richard Platt, arranged that when there was a vacancy, St John's College, Cambridge, was to nominate three Masters of Arts, from whom the Brewers' Company would appoint one.

Thomas Neale (1598–1623)
Roland Greenwood (1623–1634)
Christopher Smyth (1634–1643)
Robert Cresswell (1643–1648)
Jeremy Collier (1648–1653)
William Elliot (1653–1663)
Andrew Campion (1663–1673)
William Swayne (1673–1678)
Randolph Nicoll (1678–1703)
John Button (1703–1703)
Francis Thompson (1703–1714)
Allen Allenson (1714–1738)
Gilber Allenson (1738–1757)
William Ellis (1757–1767)
Joseph Cantrell (1767–1774)
Samuel White (1774–1785)
Rice Hughes (1785–1792)
John Griffin (1792–1799)
Methusalem Davies (1800–1823)
Joseph Summersby (1823–1825)

Heads of the Aldenham Foundation
Jonathan Wilkinson (1824–1833)
Richard Foster (1834–1836)
Thomas Spyers (1836–1842)
Alfred Leeman (1843–1876)
John Kennedy (1877–1899)
Alfred Cooke (1900–1920)
Harvey Beck (1920–1933)
George Riding (1933–1949)
Peter Mason (1949–1961)
Paul Griffin (1962–1974)
Peter Boorman (1974–1983)
Michael Higginbottom (1983–1994)
Stephen Borthwick (1994–2000)
Richard Harman (2000–2006)
James Fowler (2006–2022)
Alex Hems (2022–)

Notable Old Aldenhamians

Sir Samuel Wilks, FRS, (1824–1911), physician and pathologist.
William Josiah Sumner Hammersley (1826–1886), journalist, sportsman, co-founder of Australian rules football
Colonel Sir Robert Edis (1839–1927), architect
Sir Alfred Gilbert (1854–1934), sculptor and goldsmith
Sir William Laird Clowes (1856–1905), naval writer
Stanley Owen Buckmaster, 1st Viscount Buckmaster (1861–1934), politician, judge and Lord Chancellor, 1915–1916
Arnold McNair, 1st Baron McNair (1885–1975), legal scholar, judge of the International Court of Justice, 1946–1959, and first President of the European Court of Human Rights, 1959–1965
Sir Wallace Akers (1888–1954), chemist and Director of Research, ICI, 1944–1953
Leo Reid (1888–1938), cricketer
Sir Kenneth Pickthorn, 1st Baronet (1892–1975), historian, politician, and President of Corpus Christi College, Cambridge, 1937–1944
Group Captain Ernest Fawcus (1895–1966), cricketer and military officer
Colonel Dennis Edward Francis Waight MC (1895–1984), professional soldier and World War I flying ace
General Sir Richard Gale (1896–1982), General Officer Commanding 6th Airborne Division, 1943–1945, GOC I Airborne Corps, 1945, and Commander-in-Chief, British Army of the Rhine, 1952–1956
James Mardall (1899–1988), first-class cricketer and British Army officer
Thomas Rice Henn (1901–1974), literary scholar and writer
Lawrence P. Williams (1905–1996), film production designer
Raleigh Ashlin Skelton (1906–1970), cartographical historian
Geoffrey Longfield (1909–1943), first-class cricketer and Royal Air Force officer
Jack de Manio (1914–1988), radio broadcaster
John Blake  (1917–1944), first-class cricketer and Royal Marines officer
John Debenham Taylor (1920–2016), Secret Intelligence Service officer
Sir Michael Kerr (1921–2002), High Court Judge and Lord Justice of Appeal
Flying Officer Leslie Thomas Manser VC (1922–1942), RAF officer and bomber pilot, awarded a posthumous Victoria Cross for saving the lives of his crew.
Sir Denys Roberts (born 1923), Colonial Secretary of Hong Kong, 1973–1978, and Chief Justice of Hong Kong, 1978–1988
Churton Fairman, known as Mike Raven (1924–1997), radio disc jockey, author, actor and artist
David Blake (1925–2015), first-class cricketer
Peter Haigh (1925–2001), BBC Television presenter
Colonel Sir Michael McCorkell (1925–2006), Northern Irish soldier
Sir Kenneth Warren (1926–2019), politician
Sir David Mitchell (1928–2014), politician
Geoffrey Hewlett Thompson (born 1929), Bishop of Exeter, 1985–1999
Field Marshal Richard Vincent, Baron Vincent of Coleshill (1931–2018), Chief of the Defence Staff, 1991–1992
Robert St Clair Grant (1932–2003), comedian, writer and actor.
Al-Sultan Abdullah (born 1959), 6th Sultan of Pahang
Tuanku Muhriz ibni Almarhum Tuanku Munawir (born 1948), 11th Yang Di Pertuan Besar Negeri Sembilan 
Peter Dawes, Bishop of Derby, 1988–1995
Sir Hugh Laddie (1946–2008), High Court Judge
Sir Martin Sweeting, Director of the Surrey Space Centre and chief executive officer of Surrey Satellite Technology Ltd
Dale Winton (1955–2018), television presenter, BBC Radio 2 broadcaster
Daniel Chatto (born 1957), actor turned artist; husband of Lady Sarah Armstrong-Jones
Adrian Nicholas (1962–2005), skydiver
Marcus Buckingham (born 1966), author and motivational speaker
Baroness Karren Brady (born 1969), Managing Director of West Ham United FC
Leo Green (born 1972), British musician and broadcaster
Matt Wallace (born 1990), golfer

References

External links
Aldenham School Website
Old Aldenhamian Society Website
BBC School Profile
UK Boarding Schools Guide Profile
Profile at the Good Schools Guide

Preparatory schools in Hertfordshire
Private schools in Hertfordshire
Member schools of the Headmasters' and Headmistresses' Conference
Boarding schools in Hertfordshire
Educational institutions established in the 1590s
 
1597 establishments in England
Church of England private schools in the Diocese of St Albans
Aldenham